Bence Szabó may refer to:

 Bence Szabó (fencer) (born 1962), Hungarian fencer
 Bence Szabó (footballer, born 1990), Hungarian footballer for FC Tatabánya
 Bence Szabó (footballer, born 1998), Hungarian footballer for Diósgyőr